Isak Persson (born 7 November 2000) is a Swedish handball player for Bergischer HC and the Swedish national team.

Honours 
Swedish Cup
Runner-up: 2022
Individual awards
 Top Goalscorer Handbollsligan 2020–21 (177 goals)
All-Star Team Handbollsligan 2020–21

References

2000 births
Living people
People from Lund Municipality
Swedish male handball players
Sportspeople from Skåne County
Lugi HF players
Bergischer HC players
Expatriate handball players
Swedish expatriate sportspeople in Germany
Handball-Bundesliga players
21st-century Swedish people